Robert A. "Bob" Falk (June 3, 1926 – November 13, 2014) was an American farmer and legislator.

Born in Hagali Township, Beltrami County, Minnesota, Falk graduated from Bemidji High School. He served in the United States Navy during World War II. Falk was a farmer. Falk served in the Minnesota House of Representatives from 1969 to 1972. He died in Bemidji, Minnesota.

Notes

1926 births
2014 deaths
People from Beltrami County, Minnesota
Farmers from Minnesota
Members of the Minnesota House of Representatives
Military personnel from Minnesota